The Story Sisters is a 2009 novel by Alice Hoffman.  It is about three sisters who inhabit a fantasy world and a real world on Long Island and in Manhattan.  It has been described as magic realism.

References

2009 American novels
American magic realism novels
Novels set in Manhattan
Novels set in Long Island